Han Hye-Song is a former international table tennis player from North Korea.

Table tennis career
She won a silver medal for North Korea at the 1985 World Table Tennis Championships in the Corbillon Cup (women's team event) with Cho Jung-hui, Li Bun-Hui and Pang Chun-Dok.

See also
 List of World Table Tennis Championships medalists

References

North Korean female table tennis players
World Table Tennis Championships medalists